Lena Düsterhöft (born 26 August 1996) is a German ice hockey player for the Minnesota State Mavericks and the German national team.

She participated at the 2015 IIHF Women's World Championship.

References

External links

1996 births
Living people
Sportspeople from Munich
German women's ice hockey defencemen
Minnesota State Mavericks women's ice hockey players
German expatriate ice hockey people
German expatriate sportspeople in the United States

Minnesota State University, Mankato alumni